Lisa White is a New Zealand international lawn and indoor bowler.

White who plays for Naenae Bowling Club in Wellington, New Zealand won a silver medal in the triples at the 2012 World Outdoor Bowls Championship in Adelaide.

References 

New Zealand female bowls players
Living people
Year of birth missing (living people)
21st-century New Zealand women